Botkyrka Municipality is a municipality in Stockholm County in east central Sweden, not far from the capital Stockholm. Its seat is located in the town of Tumba.

In 1971 Grödinge was merged with Botkyrka and in 1974 Salem was added. The Salem part was split off again in 1983, and a new Salem Municipality was formed.

Botkyrka has an estimated population of 91,925.

History
The municipality is named after Saint Botvid, a Christian missionary during the 12th century. Saint Botvid is shown on the seal and coat of arms of Botkyrka Municipality, where he carries an axe and a fish. Another remnant of Botkyrka's Christian medieval history is the Botkyrka church, made of stone.

Politically the municipality is primarily Social Democratic, that has governed Botkyrka for a long period except 3 years in the early 1990s. However, with fewer seats the party now governs together with The Green Party, and The Left Party. There have also been several local parties. For a long period a local party called Botkyrkapartiet (The Botkyrka Party) has held several seats. A party was also active from mid 1980s to mid 1990s with only one purpose - to prevent the exploitation of the small airfield, F18, in Tullinge to become a commercial airport in the 1980s. In the election 2010 a local party for the area of Tullinge got 6 seats on the agenda of separating Tullinge from Botkyrka as a separate municipality.

Botkyrka has two local, weekly, newspapers called "Mitt i Botkyrka" (Middle of Botkyrka) and "Södra Sidan" (South side). They are delivered free of charge to all households.

The Swedish hip hop group The Latin Kings raps about life in Botkyrka in several of their songs.

In its December 2015 report, Police in Sweden placed the Hallunda and Norsborg districts in the most severe category of urban areas with high crime rates. In its 2017 report, Police in Sweden added the Alby and Fittja districts to the category.

Demographics
The northern and eastern parts of the municipality are in the contiguous Stockholm urban area. Tumba forms a locality (tätort) of its own (which partly is in Salem Municipality). Vårsta is in the central part. The southern half of the municipality is mostly rural.

Residents with a foreign background 
Botkyrka, particularly Northern Botkyrka, has one of the highest percentages of first and second generation immigrants in Sweden. 56.4% of the population has at least one parent born in another country. This makes the municipality a multi-cultural community with for example a big Syriac Orthodox Church in Hallunda and a mosque in Fittja.

In 2017, Botkyrka was one of three municipalities in Sweden with a population majority of foreign background. On the 31st of December 2017 the number of people with a foreign background (persons born outside of Sweden or with two parents born outside of Sweden) was 53 827, or 58.56% of the population (91 925 on the 31st of December 2017). On the 31st of December 2002 the number of residents with a foreign background was (per the same definition) 35 384, or 47.04% of the population (75 216 on the 31st of December 2002). On 31 December 2017 there were 91 925 residents in Botkyrka, of which 38 130 people (41.48%) were born in a country other than Sweden. Divided by country in the table below – the Nordic countries as well as the 12 most common countries of birth outside of Sweden for Swedish residents have been included, with other countries of birth bundled together by continent by Statistics Sweden.

Public transportation
Botkyrka is served by the Stockholm public transport system. Stockholm metro has four and Stockholm commuter rail two stations within the municipality. There is also an extensive SL bus network.

Companies
Botkyrka is a municipality with several world-famous companies. 
 Alfa Laval, a leading producer of specialized products and solutions used to heat, cool, separate and transport products including oil, water, chemicals, beverages, foodstuffs, starch and pharmaceuticals. The company also owns significant land in Botkyrka used for development of its agricultural division. 
 DeLaval, a leading producer of dairy and farming machinery.
 Crane AB, a banknote design and paper production company.

Notably, Lars Magnus Ericsson who founded the LM Ericsson company (now known as Ericsson) also had properties in Botkyrka, including Hågelby gård which today is used for conferences and as an excursion place with gardens, animals, stone age village and more.

Districts
Fittja
Alby
Hallunda
Norsborg
Eriksberg
Tumba
Tullinge
Vårsta

Sports
The following sports clubs are located in Botkyrka:

 Arameiska-Syrianska Botkyrka IF
 Konyaspor KIF
 Assyriska Botkyrka FF
 IFK Tumba FK

References

External links

Botkyrka Municipality - Official site in English
Botkyrka Municipality Facts - Official facts

Municipalities of Stockholm County
Metropolitan Stockholm
Stockholm urban area